In German linguistics, the Benrath line is the maken–machen isogloss: dialects north of the line have the original  in maken (to make), while those to the south have the innovative  (machen). The Line runs from Aachen in the west via Benrath (south of Düsseldorf) to eastern Germany near Frankfurt an der Oder in the area of Berlin and Dessau and through former East Prussia dividing Low Prussian dialect and High Prussian dialect. It is called Benrath line because Benrath is the place where it crosses the Rhine.

The High German consonant shift (3rd to 9th centuries AD), in which the (northern) Low German dialects for the most part did not participate, affected the southern varieties of the West Germanic dialect continuum. This shift is traditionally seen to distinguish the High German varieties from the other West Germanic languages. 

The impact of the High German consonant shift increases gradually to the South. The Benrath line does not mark the northernmost effect of the High German consonant shift, since the Uerdingen line, the ik–ich isogloss, lies slightly further north; and some of the peripheral changes associated with the shift did affect Low German.

See also
Speyer line
Uerdingen line
Joret line

External links
 Varieties of German
 Maps of the Benrath line

German language
Isoglosses